

Belgium
 Congo Free State –  Théophile Wahis, Governor-General of the Congo Free State (1892–1908)
 Belgian Congo – Théophile Wahis, Governor-General of the Belgian Congo (1908–1912)
 Note:  King Leopold II formally relinquished his personal control of Congo (known as Congo Free State) over to Belgium (becoming Belgian Congo), November 15, 1908.

France
 French Somaliland – 
 Pierre Hubert Auguste Pascal, Governor of French Somaliland (1906–1908)
 Jean-Baptiste Castaing, acting Governor of French Somaliland (1908–1909)
 Guinea – 
 Georges Poulet, acting Lieutenant-Governor of Guinea (1907–1908)
 Victor Théophile Liotard, Lieutenant-Governor of Guinea (1908–1910)

Japan
 Karafuto – 
 Yukihiko Konosuke, Governor-General of Karafuto (1 April 1907 – 24 April 1908)
 Tokonami Takejirō, Governor-General of Karafuto (24 April 1908 – 12 June 1908)
Hiraoka Teitarō, Governor-General of Karafuto (12 June 1908 – 5 June 1914)
 Korea – Itō Hirobumi, Resident-General (1905–1909)
 Taiwan – Sakuma Samata, Governor-General of Taiwan (15 April 1906 – May 1915)

Portugal
 Angola – Henrique Mitchell de Paiva, Governor-General of Angola (1907–1909)

United Kingdom
 Barotziland-North-Western Rhodesia
 John Carden, acting Administrator of Barotziland-North-Western Rhodesia (1907–1908)
 Robert Edward Codrington, Administrator of Barotziland-North-Western Rhodesia (1908)
 Position temporarily vacant (December 1908-January 1909)
 Bechuanaland – Francis William Panzera (1906–1916), Resident Commissioner
 Bermuda – 
 Josceline Wodehouse, Governor of Bermuda (1907–1908)
 Walter Kitchener, Governor of Bermuda (1908–1912)
 British East Africa Protectorate – Sir James Hayes Sadler (1905–1909), Governor of the British East Africa Protectorate 
 Malta Colony – Henry Grant, Governor of Malta (1907–1909)
 North-Eastern Rhodesia – Lawrence Aubrey Wallace, Administrator of North-Eastern Rhodesia (1907–1909)
 Straits Settlement – John Anderson, Governor of the Staits Settlement (1904–1911)
 Windward Islands – Ralph Champneys Williams (1906–1909), Governor of the Windward islands

United States
 Hawaii - Walter F. Frear (1907–1913), Territorial Governor of Hawaii
 Philippines – James Francis Smith (1906–1909), Governor-General of the Philippines

Colonial governors
Colonial governors
1908